Ana Célia Lima (born August 28, 1973) is a Brazilian actress. She was married to musician Gabriel o Pensador, also being his backing vocals.

Career

Television

Cinema

References

External links 

1973 births
Living people
People from Minas Gerais
Brazilian television actresses
Brazilian telenovela actresses
Brazilian film actresses
Brazilian stage actresses